Starokosteyevo (İśke Kästäy) is a rural locality (a selo) and the administrative center of Starokosteyevsky Selsoviet, Bakalinsky District, Bashkortostan, Russia. The population was 430 as of 2010. There are 3 streets.

Geography 
Starokosteyevo is located 12 km northwest of Bakaly (the district's administrative centre) by road. Novokosteyevo is the nearest rural locality.

References 

Rural localities in Bakalinsky District